Omosita nearctica is a species of sap-feeding beetle in the family Nitidulidae.

References

Further reading

External links

 

Nitidulidae
Beetles described in 1987